Georges Pilley (16 October 1885 – 3 February 1974) was a French painter. Under the name of Géo Cim, his work was part of the painting event in the art competition at the 1924 Summer Olympics.

References

1885 births
1974 deaths
19th-century French painters
20th-century French painters
20th-century French male artists
French male painters
Olympic competitors in art competitions
People from Haute-Saône
19th-century French male artists